Ringer is an EP by Kieran Hebden under the name Four Tet. It was released on 21 April 2008 in the UK, and is Hebden's first major release of original solo material since 2005's Everything Ecstatic Part 2.

Track listing

References
 
Ringer release page from the Domino Records website

Four Tet albums
2008 EPs
Domino Recording Company EPs
Albums produced by Kieran Hebden